The Harvard Journal of Law and Public Policy is a law review for conservative and libertarian legal scholarship. It was established by Harvard Law School students Spencer Abraham and Stephen Eberhard in 1978, leading to the founding of the Federalist Society, for which it is the official journal. It is one of the top five most widely circulated law reviews in the United States.

Notable alumni include Neil Gorsuch, Ted Cruz, Tom Cotton, Alexander Acosta, Mike Pompeo, David Barron, Rachel Brand, Ron DeSantis, Jennifer Walker Elrod, John K. Bush, Joseph D. Kearney, Kevin Newsom, Gregory G. Katsas, Adrian Vermeule, Orin Kerr, Sarah Isgur, and David Frum.

Past authors have included George H. W. Bush, Guido Calabresi, Ted Cruz, Viet D. Dinh, Frank H. Easterbrook, Richard Garnett, Robert P. George, Douglas H. Ginsburg, Lino Graglia, Neil Gorsuch, Alex Kozinski, George L. Priest, William H. Pryor Jr., Neomi Rao, William Rehnquist, Antonin Scalia, Eugene Scalia, Clarence Thomas, Ron Paul, and John Yoo.

In October Term 2018, the Journal was cited in the 5th most Supreme Court opinions, finishing ahead of flagship journals such as the Yale Law Journal and the Stanford Law Review.

In August 2021, the Journal debuted an online counterpart to the print journal titled JLPP: Per Curiam. Because of the lack of restrictions from the strict print publication schedule of the physical journal, the online portion allows for commentary on current and pressing issues.

See also 

List of law reviews in the United States
New York University Journal of Law & Liberty
Texas Review of Law and Politics
Georgetown Journal of Law and Public Policy

References

External links
 

American law journals
Harvard Law School
Publications established in 1978
Libertarian publications
Law journals edited by students
Harvard University publications
Law and public policy journals
English-language journals